Glenda May Jackson  (born 9 May 1936) is an English actress and former Member of Parliament (MP). She is one of the few artists to achieve the Triple Crown of Acting winning the two Academy Awards, three Emmy Awards and a Tony Award. She was made Commander of the Order of the British Empire by Queen Elizabeth II in 1978.

She has won the Academy Award for Best Actress twice: for her role in Women in Love (1970) and A Touch of Class (1973). She won the BAFTA Award for Best Actress in a Leading Role for Sunday Bloody Sunday (1971). Other notable roles include Mary, Queen of Scots (1971), Hedda (1975), The Incredible Sarah (1976), and Hopscotch (1980). She won two Primetime Emmy Awards for her role as Elizabeth I in the BBC series Elizabeth R (1971). She received the British Academy Television Award for Best Actress for her role in Elizabeth Is Missing (2019). 

Jackson studied at the Royal Academy of Dramatic Art (RADA). She made her Broadway debut in Marat/Sade (1966). She received five Laurence Olivier Award nominations for her West End roles in Stevie (1977), Antony and Cleopatra (1979), Rose (1980), Strange Interlude (1984), and King Lear (2016), the later being her first role after a 25 year absence from acting, which she reprised on Broadway in 2019. She won the Tony Award for Best Actress in a Play for her role in the revival of Edward Albee's Three Tall Women (2018).

Jackson took a hiatus from acting to take on a career in politics from 1992 to 2015, and was elected as the Labour Party MP for Hampstead and Highgate in the 1992 general election. She served as a junior transport minister from 1997 to 1999 during the government of Tony Blair, later becoming critical of Blair. After constituency boundary changes, she represented Hampstead and Kilburn from 2010. At the 2010 general election, her majority of 42 votes was one of the closest results of the election. Jackson stood down at the 2015 general election, and returned to acting.

Early life
Glenda Jackson was born at 151 Market Street in Birkenhead, Cheshire on Saturday 9 May 1936. Her mother named her after the Hollywood film star Glenda Farrell. Shortly after her birth, the family moved to Hoylake in the Wirral. Glenda's family were very poor, and lived in a two-up, two-down house at 21 Lake Place with an outside toilet. Her father Harry was a builder, while her mother Joan (née Pearce) worked on the local supermarket checkout, pulled pints in a pub, and was a domestic cleaner.

The oldest of four daughters, Glenda was educated at Holy Trinity Church of England and Cathcart Street primary schools, followed by West Kirby County Grammar School for Girls in nearby West Kirby, and performed in the Townswomen's Guild drama group during her teens. Jackson made her first acting appearance in J. B. Priestley's Mystery of Greenfingers in 1952 for the YMCA Players in Hoylake. She worked for two years in Boots the Chemists, before winning a scholarship in 1954 to study at the Royal Academy of Dramatic Art (RADA) in London. Jackson moved to the capital to begin the course in early 1955.

Acting career

1957–1968: Early career
In January 1957, Jackson made her professional stage debut in Ted Willis's Doctor in the House at the Connaught Theatre in Worthing. This was followed by Terence Rattigan's Separate Tables, while Jackson was still at RADA, and she began appearing in repertory theatre. She was also a stage manager at Crewe in repertory theatre. 

From 1958 to 1961, Jackson went through a period of two and a half years in which she was unable to find acting work. She unsuccessfully auditioned for the Royal Shakespeare Company (RSC), and undertook what she later described as "a series of soul-destroying jobs". This included waitressing at The 2i's Coffee Bar, clerical work for a large City of London firm, answering phones for a theatrical agent, and a role at British Home Stores. She also worked as a Bluecoat at Butlin's Pwllheli holiday resort on the Llŷn Peninsula in North West Wales, where her new husband and fellow actor Roy Hodges was a Redcoat. Jackson eventually returned to repertory theatre in Dundee, but worked in bars in between acting jobs.

Jackson made her film debut in a bit part in the kitchen sink drama This Sporting Life (1963). A member of the RSC for four years from 1963, she originally joined for director Peter Brook's Theatre of Cruelty season, which included Peter Weiss' Marat/Sade (1965), where she played an inmate of an insane asylum portraying Charlotte Corday, the assassin of Jean-Paul Marat. The production ran on Broadway in 1965 and in Paris (Jackson also appeared in the 1967 film version). She appeared as Ophelia in Peter Hall's production of Hamlet the same year. Critic Penelope Gilliatt thought Jackson was the only Ophelia she had seen who was ready to play the Prince himself.

The RSC's staging at the Aldwych Theatre of US (1966), a protest play against the Vietnam War, also featured Jackson, and she appeared in its film version, Tell Me Lies. Later that year, she starred in the psychological drama Negatives (1968), which was not a huge financial success, but won her more good reviews.

1969–1980: Film and television
Jackson's starring role in Ken Russell's film adaptation of D. H. Lawrence's Women in Love (1969) led to her first Academy Award for Best Actress. Brian McFarlane, the main author of The Encyclopedia of British Film, wrote: "Her blazing intelligence, sexual challenge and abrasiveness were at the service of a superbly written role in a film with a passion rare in the annals of British cinema."

In the process of gaining funding for The Music Lovers (1970) from United Artists, Russell explained it as "the story of a homosexual who marries a nymphomaniac," the couple being the composer Pyotr Ilyich Tchaikovsky (Richard Chamberlain) and Antonina Miliukova, played by Jackson. The film received mixed reviews in the U.S.; the anonymous reviewer in Variety wrote of the two principals, "Their performances are more dramatically bombastic than sympathetic, or sometimes even believable." The Music Lovers was a box-office success in Europe, reaching No. 1 in the UK's weekly rankings in March 1971. It was the first of four films starring Jackson which topped the box-office charts in the UK. Jackson was initially interested in the role of Sister Jeanne in The Devils (1971), Russell's next film, but turned it down after script rewrites and deciding that she did not wish to play a third neurotic character in a row.

Jackson had her head shaved to play Queen Elizabeth I in the BBC's serial Elizabeth R (1971). After the series aired on PBS in the US, she received two Primetime Emmy Awards for her performance. She also played Queen Elizabeth in the film Mary, Queen of Scots; and gained an Academy Award nomination as well as a BAFTA Award for her role in John Schlesinger's Sunday Bloody Sunday (both 1971). In July, Sunday Bloody Sunday topped the UK box-office charts for two weeks. That year, British exhibitors voted her the 6th most popular star at the British box office. Jackson's popularity was such that 1971 saw her receive Best Film Actress awards from the Variety Club of Great Britain (who also rewarded her similarly in 1975 and 1978), the New York Film Critics and the US National Society of Film Critics.

Mary, Queen of Scots was premièred in December 1971 in Los Angeles and was the 1972 Royal Film Performance in Britain, attended by the Queen Mother, Princess Margaret and Lord Snowdon. The film reached No. 1 in the UK box-office charts in April that year, a position it held for five consecutive weeks. Jackson made the first of several appearances with Morecambe and Wise in their 1971 Christmas special. Appearing in a comedy sketch as Cleopatra for the BBC Morecambe and Wise Show, she delivered the line, "All men are fools and what makes them so is having beauty like what I have got." Her later appearances included a song-and-dance routine (where she was pushed offstage by Eric), a period drama about Queen Victoria, and another musical routine (in their Thames Television series) where she was elevated ten feet in the air by a misbehaving swivel chair. Jackson and Wise also appeared in a 1981 information film for the Blood Transfusion Service.

Filmmaker Melvin Frank saw Jackson's comedy skills on the Morecambe and Wise Show and offered her the lead female role in his romantic comedy A Touch of Class (1973), co-starring George Segal, which was a UK box-office No. 1 in June 1973. In February 1974, Jackson's role in the film won her the Academy Award for Best Actress. She continued to work in the theatre, returning to the RSC for the lead in Ibsen's Hedda Gabler. A later film version directed by Trevor Nunn was released as Hedda (1975), for which Jackson was nominated for an Oscar. In The New York Times, Vincent Canby wrote: "This version of Hedda Gabler is all Miss Jackson's Hedda and, I must say, great fun to watch ... Miss Jackson's technical virtuosity is particularly suited to a character like Hedda. Her command of her voice and her body, as well as the Jackson mannerisms, have the effect of separating the actress from the character in a very curious way."

In 1978, she scored box office success in the United States in the romantic comedy House Calls, co-starring Walter Matthau, with the film spending two weeks at No. 1 in the US box-office rankings. House Calls was the biggest box-office hit of her career in the US. That year, she was awarded a CBE. In 1979, she reunited with her A Touch of Class colleagues Segal and Frank for the romantic comedy Lost and Found. Jackson and Matthau teamed again in the comedy Hopscotch (1980), which debuted at No. 1 in its opening weekend at the US box office, also spending its second week in the top spot.

For her 1980 appearance on The Muppet Show, Jackson told the producers she would perform any material they liked. In her appearance, she has a delusion that she is a pirate captain who takes over the Muppet Theatre as her ship.

1980–1992: Later acting career
Fifteen years after the New York engagement of Marat/Sade, Jackson returned to Broadway in Andrew Davies's Rose (1981) opposite Jessica Tandy; both actresses received Tony nominations for their roles. 

In September 1983, The Glenda Jackson Theatre in Birkenhead was named in her honour. The theatre was attached to Wirral Metropolitan College, but demolished in 2005 following the establishment of a purpose-built site for students.

In 1985, she appeared as Nina Leeds in a revival of Eugene O'Neill's Strange Interlude at the Nederlander Theatre in a production which had originated in London the previous year and ran for eight weeks. John Beaufort for The Christian Science Monitor wrote: "Bravura is the inevitable word for Miss Jackson's display of feminine wiles and brilliant technique." Frank Rich in The New York Times thought Jackson, "with her helmet of hair and gashed features," when Leeds is a young woman, "looks like a cubist portrait of Louise Brooks," and later when the character has aged several decades, is "mesmerizing as a Zelda Fitzgeraldesque neurotic, a rotting and spiteful middle-aged matron and, finally, a spent, sphinx-like widow happily embracing extinction." Herbert Wise directed a British television version of O'Neill's drama which was first broadcast in the US as part of PBS's American Playhouse in January 1988.

In November 1984, Jackson appeared in the title role of Robert David MacDonald's English translation of Racine's Phèdre, titled Phedra, at The Old Vic. The play was designed and directed by Philip Prowse, and Robert Eddison played Theramenes. The Daily Telegraph's John Barber wrote of her performance, "Wonderfully impressive... The actress finds a voice as jagged and hoarse as her torment". Benedict Nightingale in the New Statesman was intrigued that Jackson didn't go in for nobility, but played Racine's feverish queen as if to say that "being skewered in the guts by Cupid is an ugly, bitter, humiliating business". The costume which Prowse designed for Jackson's performance is in the Victoria and Albert Museum, and iconic photographs of Jackson in the role can be found online.

In 1989, Jackson appeared in Ken Russell's The Rainbow, playing Anna Brangwen, mother of Gudrun, the part for which she had won her first Academy Award twenty years earlier. The same year, she played Martha in a Los Angeles production of Edward Albee's Who's Afraid of Virginia Woolf? at the Doolittle Theatre (now the Ricardo Montalbán Theatre). Directed by the playwright himself, this staging featured John Lithgow as George. Dan Sullivan in the Los Angeles Times wrote that Jackson and Lithgow performed "with the assurance of dedicated character assassins, not your hire-and-salary types" with the actors being able to display their character's capacity for antipathy. Albee was disappointed with this production, pointing to Jackson, who he thought "had retreated back to the thing she can do very well, that ice cold performance. I don't know whether she got scared, but in rehearsal she was being Martha, and the closer we got to opening the less Martha she was!"

She performed the lead role in Howard Barker's Scenes from an Execution as Galactia, a sixteenth century female Venetian artist, at the Almeida Theatre in 1990. It was an adaptation of Barker's 1984 radio play in which Jackson had played the same role.

2015–present: Return to acting
In 2015, Jackson returned to acting following a 23-year absence, having retired from politics. She took the role of Dide, the ancient matriarch, in a series of Radio 4 plays, Blood, Sex and Money, based on a series of novels by Émile Zola. She returned to the stage at the end of 2016, playing the title role in William Shakespeare's King Lear at the Old Vic Theatre in London, in a production running from 25 October to 3 December. Jackson was nominated for Best Actress at the Olivier Awards for her role, but ultimately lost out to Billie Piper. She did, however, win the Natasha Richardson Award for Best Actress at the 2017 Evening Standard Theatre Awards for her performance. Dominic Cavendish of The Telegraph wrote, "Glenda Jackson is tremendous as King Lear. No ifs, no buts. In returning to the stage at the age of 80, 25 years after her last performance (as the Clytemnestra-like Christine in Eugene O'Neill's Mourning Becomes Electra at the Glasgow Citizens), she has pulled off one of those 11th-hour feats of human endeavour that will surely be talked about for years to come by those who see it."

In 2018, Jackson returned to Broadway in a revival of Edward Albee's Three Tall Women, winning the 2018 Tony Award for Best Actress in a Play. Marilyn Stasio of Variety wrote, "Watching Glenda Jackson in theatrical flight is like looking straight into the sun. Her expressive face registers her thoughts while guarding her feelings. But it's the voice that really thrills. Deeply pitched and clarion clear, it's the commanding voice of stern authority. Don't mess with this household god or she'll turn you to stone."

Jackson returned to the role of King Lear on Broadway in a production that opened in April 2019. Director Sam Gold describes her portrayal of Lear in The New York Times Magazine: "She is going to go through something most people don't go through. You're all invited. Glenda Jackson is going to endure this, and you're going to witness it."

In 2019, after a 27-year absence, Jackson returned to television drama, portraying an elderly grandmother struggling with dementia in Elizabeth Is Missing on BBC One, based on the novel of the same name by Emma Healey, for which she won the BAFTA TV Award for Best Actress and International Emmy Award for Best Actress.

It was reported in February 2021 that Jackson would co-star with Michael Caine in The Great Escaper, a film telling the true story of Bernard Jordan's escape from his care home to commemorate the 70th anniversary of the D-Day landings in France. Caine will play Jordan, with Jackson as his wife Irene. Caine and Jackson previously starred together in The Romantic Englishwoman (1976).

In July 2022, the British Film Institute celebrated her film and television career with a month-long retrospective season at the BFI Southbank in London. As well as screenings of her work, the programme included Glenda Jackson in Conversation, in which she was interviewed about her career live on stage by broadcaster John Wilson.

Political career 
Jackson joined the Labour Party in the early 1950s, at the age of 16. Her earlier campaigns were not party political, however. In 1978, she was one of the public figures who lent their name as a sponsor to the Anti-Nazi League. The same year, she appeared in a print advertisement for Oxfam. Jackson was on the executive of the National Association of Voluntary Hostels, and spoke at rallies for the housing charity Shelter. Human rights were also an area of interest, and she joined a demonstration outside the Indonesian Embassy to protest against the detention of political prisoners. She was involved in children's charities, as president of the Toy Libraries Association and narrating programmes for UNICEF. She also gave her time and money to a home for emotionally disturbed children in Berkshire run by former actress Coral Atkins.

Jackson was a supporter of the National Abortion Campaign, and organised a benefit evening for them at the Cambridge Theatre, which raised over £3,000. She also supported Dr Una Kroll's Women's Rights candidacy for Sutton and Cheam at the October 1974 general election. In addition, Jackson made several appearances on BBC Radio 4's Any Questions? debate programme during this period of her career. She had considered becoming a social worker, and in 1979 began a social science degree at the Open University, but dropped out a few months later after falling behind with her essays. Jackson appeared in a number of charity films, including on behalf of International Year of the Child, Voluntary Service Overseas and Oxfam. Other such films featured her campaigning against polio and the arms trade.

Labour Party 
Jackson's name was linked to several parliamentary seats over the years; she was approached by a Constituency Labour Party in Bristol to stand at the 1979 general election, but this did not materialise. An approach was also made to her about the possibility of being a candidate for the marginal Welsh seat of Bridgend at the 1983 general election, which she turned down in order to pursue a humanities degree at Thames Polytechnic. However, she dropped out before starting the course. At that election, she supported Paul Boateng and Ian Wilson, Labour's candidates for Hertfordshire West and Watford, respectively. She was also a member of the Arts for Labour group.

In 1986, Jackson visited Ethiopia as part of Oxfam's efforts to help with the famine there, and in 1989 she approached VSO about the chance of working in Africa for a couple of years. She got involved in the African National Congress campaign against apartheid in South Africa, and in September 1988 chaired a United Nations committee on the cultural boycott. Jackson appeared in a party political broadcast for Labour in February 1987. In June that year, she was present at a campaign rally with Labour leader Neil Kinnock for the general election.

In December 1989, it was rumoured that Jackson had been approached by two branches of Leeds East CLP to succeed their Labour MP, Denis Healey. However, according to her biographer, Chris Bryant, she turned down this opportunity. In late 1989, two members of Hampstead and Highgate CLP got in touch with Jackson about the possibility of standing there. Despite having never been to a Labour ward meeting, she won over the local party, and triumphed in the ballot, which took place on 28 March 1990. Jackson defeated three candidates who were all politically to her left: Kate Allen (Ken Livingstone's partner and a Camden councillor), economic history lecturer Sarah Palmer (daughter of former Labour MP Arthur Palmer) and Maureen Robinson, a previous Mayor of Camden.

Jackson has since stated that she felt Britain was being "destroyed" by the policies of the then prime minister Margaret Thatcher and the Conservative government, so that she was willing to do "anything that was legal" to oppose her. In November 1990, Thatcher stood down as prime minister and leader of the Conservative Party. She was replaced by John Major, who would lead the party into the next general election. At the time, Hampstead and Highgate was held by the Conservative Geoffrey Finsberg, who had announced his retirement as an MP. Finsberg had represented the constituency and its predecessor, Hampstead, since 1970, when he had gained it from the last Labour MP to be elected for the seat.

In Parliament 
Jackson retired from acting in 1991 in order to devote herself to politics full-time as the prospective parliamentary candidate for Hampstead and Highgate. Although her party did not win the 1992 general election, as had been speculated, there was an above average swing to Labour in her constituency, and she gained the seat, narrowly beating the Conservative candidate Oliver Letwin, a former adviser to prime minister Thatcher. Jackson, whose campaign had been sponsored by the train drivers' union, ASLEF, was the first of Labour's 1992 intake to join the front bench when she became shadow transport minister in July 1996.

Following Labour's landslide victory in the 1997 general election, which saw her comfortably re-elected, she was appointed as a junior minister in the government of Prime Minister Tony Blair, with responsibility for transport in London. She resigned from the post in 1999 before an unsuccessful attempt to be nominated as the Labour candidate for the election of the first Mayor of London in 2000. In Labour's selection ballot, she came a distant third behind Frank Dobson and Ken Livingstone, being eliminated in the first round of voting with 4.4% of the total. Jackson was once again re-elected to represent her constituency at the 2001 general election.

As a high-profile backbencher, Jackson became a regular critic of Blair over his plans to introduce higher education tuition fees in England, Wales and Northern Ireland. She also called for him to resign following the Judicial Enquiry by Lord Hutton in 2003 surrounding the reasons for going to war in Iraq and the death of government adviser Dr. David Kelly. At the subsequent 2005 general election, she held her seat, albeit with a reduced majority and a swing to the Conservatives, who had selected local councillor Piers Wauchope.

By October 2005, her disagreements with Blair's leadership swelled to a point where she threatened to challenge the prime minister as a stalking horse candidate in a leadership contest if he did not stand down within a reasonable amount of time. On 31 October 2006, Jackson was one of 12 Labour MPs to back Plaid Cymru and the Scottish National Party's call for an inquiry into the Iraq War.

Her constituency boundaries changed for the 2010 general election. The Gospel Oak and Highgate wards became part of Holborn and St Pancras, and the new Hampstead and Kilburn constituency took in territory from Brent to include Brondesbury, Kilburn and Queens Park wards (from the old Brent East and Brent South seats). On 6 May 2010, Jackson was elected as the MP for the new Hampstead and Kilburn constituency by a margin of 42 votes over Conservative Chris Philp, with the Liberal Democrat candidate Edward Fordham less than a thousand votes behind them. She had the closest result in England, and the second smallest majority of any MP at the 2010 election. Jackson's seat was marginal for most of her time in politics, with the 1997 election being the only occasion on which she received an absolute majority of votes cast in the constituency.

In June 2011, Jackson announced that, presuming the Parliament elected in 2010 lasted until 2015, she would not seek re-election. She stated: "I will be almost 80 and by then it will be time for someone else to have a turn." The eventual election was held two days before her 79th birthday, 23 years after she had first entered the House of Commons.

In April 2013, Jackson gave a speech in parliament following the death of Margaret Thatcher. She accused Thatcher of treating "vices as virtues" and stated that, because of Thatcherism, the UK was susceptible to unprecedented unemployment rates and homelessness. Another speech of Jackson's went viral in June 2014 when she gave a scathing assessment of Iain Duncan Smith's tenure as Secretary of State for Work and Pensions, telling him that he was responsible for the "destruction of the welfare state and the total and utter incompetence of his department".

Views 
Jackson is a socialist, and was generally considered to be a traditional left-winger during her political career, often disagreeing with the dominant Blairite governing Third Way faction in the Labour Party; she rebelled against her party in parliamentary votes on a number of occasions. However, she was also opposed to the left-wing politics of Arthur Scargill and Militant which dominated the party's battles in the 1980s. Jackson labelled Militant and Derek Hatton's politics as "self-indulgent crap", and she sent leader Neil Kinnock a congratulatory telegram after his high-profile 1985 Labour Party conference speech, in which he criticised the activities of Militant et al. In the 1992 Labour leadership election, she supported the successful candidate, John Smith, and two years later, backed Tony Blair, who won the contest, subsequently becoming prime minister.

Jackson opposes the British monarchy, and is a republican. The Guardian'''s Simon Hattenstone summed up Jackson's views as "traditional Labour, solidarity, feminism". Jackson has been an outspoken feminist, criticising the lack of gender equality for women.

Jackson voiced her support for Blair's successor as prime minister, Gordon Brown, in 2008. Brown appeared with Jackson on a campaign visit for the 2010 general election, with him describing her as "a very close friend". In the 2010 Labour leadership election, with Brown having stood down, Jackson voted for David Miliband, considered to be more of a political moderate than his older brother Ed (a figure on the party's soft left), who was ultimately elected as party leader.

Following her departure from parliament, the Labour Party elected Jeremy Corbyn as its leader. Jackson has stated that she supported him "as a person", and would have nominated him in the 2015 leadership election. However, she qualified her support, adding, "Never in a million years would I have voted for him, though."

In the 1975 referendum, Jackson voted against Britain joining the European Economic Community. She subsequently changed her mind on the issue, however, and supported Britain remaining in the European Union in the 2016 referendum. Despite this, she disagreed with calls for a second vote. To this effect, she stated her admiration for the then prime minister Theresa May; when this was queried by the interviewer, The Guardian's Emma Brockes, Jackson responded: "I've certainly admired her in the way she has handled herself over Brexit, yes! I do admire her for her tenacity, trying to deliver the referendum result to the people of our country, even though I disapproved of it."

Interviewed in July 2020, shortly after Sir Keir Starmer had taken over as party leader from Corbyn, Jackson declared herself happy with him in the role. In 2022, she commented on Starmer, "I just wish Keir would get someone to help him develop his voice," calling it "one of his big drawbacks".

Personal life
In 1957, Jackson met Roy Hodges, a stage manager and fellow actor in their repertory theatre company. The pair soon embarked upon a relationship. Jackson and Hodges were married on 2 August 1958 at St Marylebone Register Office in London. In 1969, their son, Daniel, was born; Jackson was six months pregnant when filming on Women in Love was completed. Dan Hodges is a former Labour Party adviser and commentator, who works as a newspaper columnist for The Mail on Sunday. When her son told her he was going to write for the conservative newspaper, Jackson responded, "Well, I'll have to emigrate!"

Jackson's marriage was running into difficulties by the early 1970s, and in 1975, she began an affair with Andy Phillips, the lighting director for a production of Hedda Gabler'' which she was starring in. Roy Hodges sued Jackson for divorce on the grounds of her adultery with Phillips in November that year, and the couple were divorced in 1976. Jackson and Phillips were in an on-off relationship until 1981. It was reported in 2016 that she had been "happily single for decades".

During the early years of her career, Jackson and her husband lived in Swiss Cottage, north west London, an area she would later represent as an MP. In the late 1960s, the couple moved to Blackheath, south east London. , she lives in a basement granny flat there, with her son, his wife, and their son, her only grandchild, upstairs. Jackson listed her interests in Who's Who as cooking, gardening and reading Jane Austen.

Acting credits

Awards and honours

Commonwealth honours
 Commonwealth honours

Scholastic
 Chancellor, visitor, governor, rector and fellowships

Honorary degrees

Notes

References

External links

 
 
 
 Glenda Jackson in conversation | BFI Q&A
 Camden Labour Party
 

|-

1936 births
20th-century English actresses
20th-century British politicians
20th-century British women politicians
21st-century British politicians
21st-century British women politicians
21st-century English actresses
Alumni of RADA
Associated Society of Locomotive Engineers and Firemen-sponsored MPs
BBC people
Best Actress Academy Award winners
Best Actress BAFTA Award winners
Best Actress BAFTA Award (television) winners
Best Musical or Comedy Actress Golden Globe (film) winners
British actor-politicians
Commanders of the Order of the British Empire
David di Donatello winners
English film actresses
English republicans
English social commentators
English stage actresses
English television actresses
Female members of the Parliament of the United Kingdom for English constituencies
International Emmy Award for Best Actress winners
Labour Party (UK) MPs for English constituencies
Living people
Outstanding Performance by a Lead Actress in a Drama Series Primetime Emmy Award winners
Outstanding Performance by a Lead Actress in a Miniseries or Movie Primetime Emmy Award winners
People educated at West Kirby Grammar School
People from Birkenhead
People from Blackheath, London
People from Hoylake
People from Swiss Cottage
Royal Shakespeare Company members
English socialist feminists
Tony Award winners
UK MPs 1992–1997
UK MPs 1997–2001
UK MPs 2001–2005
UK MPs 2005–2010
UK MPs 2010–2015